National Union for Democracy is a political party in Angola. The party was founded on October 2, 1991. The party is a member of the coalition New Democracy. The party was previously a member of the coalition Parties of the Civilian Opposition, but pulled out of it and took part in founding New Democracy in December 2006.

References

Political parties in Angola
Political parties established in 1991
1991 establishments in Angola